Kugama, also known as Wam (Wã̀m) or Gengle, is an Adamawa language of Nigeria. It is spoken in Mayo-Belwa and Fufore Local Government Areas of Adamawa State. It is classified within the Yendang group of the Adamawa language family.

Speakers refer to their language as ɲáː wàm. Kugama is an exonym that is often used by the speakers themselves when speaking in other languages, while Wã̀m is the name they use to refer to themselves.

Further reading
Blench, Roger. 2009. The Maya (Yendang) languages.
Litvinova, Lora. 2014. Притяжательные местоимения в языке кугама [Possessive pronouns in Kugama]. In Alexandr Ju. Zheltov (ed.), Антропология и лингвистика. Материалы петербургских экспедиций в Африку [Anthropology and Linguistics. Materials of St. Petersburg expeditions to Africa], 167–173. St. Petersburg: MAE RAN.
Litvinova, Lora. 2015. Личные местоимения в языке кугама [Personal pronouns in Kugama]. Paper presented at 28th International Conference on historiography and source studies of Asia and Africa “Asia and Africa in the Changing World”. St. Petersburg.
Litvinova, Lora. 2016. Элементы морфосинтаксиса языка кугама [Topics in Kugama morphosyntax]. St. Petersburg: St.Petersburg State University MA thesis.

References

External links
Wam, by Lora Litvinova. AdaGram.

Languages of Nigeria
Mumuye–Yendang languages